Alejandro Falla Ramírez (born 14 November 1983) is a retired professional male tennis player from Colombia. The left-hander turned pro in 2000 and achieved a career-high singles ranking of World No. 48 in July 2012. At the 2006 Wimbledon tournament, Falla upset 9th seed Nikolay Davydenko and at the 2007 Sony Ericsson Open he beat 9th seed Tommy Haas in straight sets. He reached the semifinals of the Grand Prix de Tennis de Lyon in 2007, beating players such as the 5th seed Ivan Ljubičić.

Career

The Colombian became the first player from his country to break into the top 100 of the ATP rankings since Mauricio Hadad in 1996. In 2006, Alejandro qualified a career-high five times into the main draw of ATP tournaments. In his second tournament of the year, he reached the final of the Mexico City Challenger. He then went on to earn points for his country in a Davis Cup tie against Paraguay Davis Team. Then later in April, he won the Bogotá Challenger. At Roland Garros, he reached the second round after defeating Justin Gimelstob, though he lost to Roger Federer in the second round. A few weeks later at Wimbledon, he managed to beat Nikolay Davydenko in a four-set thriller. His victory over Davydenko was his first win over a top-10 player, and a first ever for a Colombian player. However, he was then defeated in the second round by Philipp Kohlschreiber in another four-set match. He then reached the second round in the US Open. In the first round, he beat Juan Martín del Potro in four sets, before being defeated by Dmitry Tursunov in straight sets.

Falla almost caused a sensation in the first round of Wimbledon in 2010, winning the first two sets against defending champion Roger Federer and serving for the match at 5–4 in the fourth set (he was three points away from winning), before Federer eventually won 5–7, 4–6, 6–4, 7–6, 6–0.

His best result in a Grand Slam was in 2011 at the French Open. Falla reached the fourth round, where he lost to the unseeded Juan Ignacio Chela.

In the 2014 Gerry Weber Open in Halle, Falla rallied to beat 2011 champion Philipp Kohlschreiber 5-7, 7-6 (5), 6-4 to become the first Colombian to reach the final of a grass-court tournament. He lost to six-time champion Roger Federer in the final.

Juniors
Alejandro Falla made it to the semi-finals in the 2001 French Open, giving a big inspiration to Colombian players aspiring to achieve strong results in junior open tennis.

Doubles
In junior doubles at the French Open, he and compatriot Carlos Salamanca defeated the German duo Markus Bayer and Philipp Petzschner, the first junior title won by Colombians in a Grand Slam.

Doubles: 1 (1 title)

ATP career finals

Singles: 2 (2 runner-ups)

Doubles: 1 (1 runner-up)

ATP Challenger and ITF Futures finals

Singles: 24 (14–10)

Doubles: 20 (10–10)

Performance timelines

Singles

Doubles

References

External links 

 
 
 
 
 
 
 
 Falla world ranking history

1983 births
Living people
Sportspeople from Cali
Colombian male tennis players
French Open junior champions
Tennis players at the 2012 Summer Olympics
Olympic tennis players of Colombia

Central American and Caribbean Games silver medalists for Colombia
Central American and Caribbean Games bronze medalists for Colombia
Competitors at the 2002 Central American and Caribbean Games
Grand Slam (tennis) champions in boys' doubles
Central American and Caribbean Games medalists in tennis